Unicorn University, formerly known as Unicorn College, is a vocationally oriented private university located in Prague. It was established in 2007 by Unicorn a.s. The institution was transferred under the ownership of Unicorn Learning Centre a.s. in 2009 in which Unicorn a.s. is as a sole owner.

Study 

The university offers study programmes in full-time and combined form at the bachelor and master level, accredited by the Ministry of Education, Youth and Sports. All bachelor study programmes are available in English as well.

The university also runs a double-degree programme implemented in cooperation with the University of Applied Sciences Würzburg-Schweinfurt (FHWS). The programme lets students spend two semesters (2nd year of study) at the university in Bavaria. Upon successful graduation, students acquire a bachelor's degree in Business Management (Unicorn University) and in International Management (FHWS).

“Unicorn Work & Study” represents another option for the study. The programme combines working for Unicorn and studying at Unicorn University at the same time.

Bachelor Study Programmes 

 Software Development
 Business Management

Follow-up Master Study Programmes 

 Software Engineering and Big Data
 Applied Economics and Data Analysis

Classes take place at three campuses – at Parukářka, in Holešovice and Vysočany. Students can use online apps for each course, developed internally to achieve higher interactivity, availability and overall study attractiveness.

Focus of Study 

The study at Unicorn University focuses on IT, economics, business management and data analysis. Unicorn University is the only private university in the Czech Republic with technical specialization. The university currently hosts students from 16 countries and foreign students make roughly a quarter of the total number of students.

Some graduates find a job in the Unicorn a.s group. The structure of graduates focusing on IT and graduates focusing on economics was balanced in 2019. The Ministry of Labour and Social Affairs did not register any Unicorn University graduate as unemployed in the same year.

Science and Research 
Unicorn University has been engaged in applied research for a long time. The school cooperates with many corporations. Solving research infrastructure for CERN experiments represents a most important project. In the Czech Republic, the project is run in cooperation with the Czech Technical University in Prague, Charles University and the Czech Academy of Sciences. The research programme constitutes a long-term project of research cooperation planned to be finalized in 2025. Unicorn University represents a sole contractual developer and supplier of the ATLAS Product Database. Both academic employees and students take part and students have an opportunity to process their qualification thesis within the project.

Research papers of Unicorn University academic employees have been published for example in International Small Business Journal-Researching Entrepreneurship, Marketing Science or Journal of Atmospheric and Solar-Terrestrial Physics. Monographs have been published e.g. by the Springer Nature publishing house.

Unicorn Research Centre was established in 2017 at Unicorn University, focusing on research.

The school has a library with items available for the whole Unicorn a.s. group and with remote access to research databases.

References

External links
 Unicorn University site
 Unicorn University information on vysokeskoly.com (in Czech)

Universities in the Czech Republic
Educational institutions in Prague
Educational institutions established in 2006
2006 establishments in the Czech Republic
Žižkov